Events from the year 1913 in Russia.

Incumbents
 Monarch – Nicholas II
 Chairman of the Council of Ministers – Vladimir Nikolayevich Kokovtsov

Events
 January – Stalin (whose first article using this name is published this month) travels to Vienna to carry out research. Until he leaves on February 16 the city is home simultaneously to him, Hitler, Trotsky and Tito alongside Berg, Freud and Jung and Ludwig and Paul Wittgenstein.
 
 
 
 
 
 
 300th anniversary of the Romanov dynasty
 Brusilov Expedition
 Baymak
 Benliahmet Railway Station
 Bilozerske
 Cuvânt Moldovenesc (magazine)
 DLT (department store)
 Glasul Basarabiei
 Hotel Polonia Palace
 Insignia of Saint Olga
 Ismailiyya building
 Kharkiv Choral Synagogue
 Kiev Conservatory
 Kronstadt Naval Cathedral
 Mykolayiv Regional Museum of Local History
 Qazaq
 Regional Museum of local lore of Mykolaiv
 Saint Petersburg Mosque
 Sarıkamış railway station
 Selim railway station
 Shakhmaty v SSSR
 Sochi railway station
 Soğanlı Railway Station
 Spaso House
 Tallinn Power Plant
 Di Tsayt (Saint Petersburg)
 Vilnis
 Vinnytsia Tramway

Births

Deaths
 
 April 24 – Vsevolod Abramovich, aviator (b. 1890)
 May 6 – Elena Guro, painter and writer (b. 1877)
 June 1 – Iosif Dubrovinsky, Bolshevik and comrade of Vladimir Lenin prior to the Russian Revolution (b. 1877)
 July 20 – Vsevolod Rudnev, admiral (b. 1855)
 August 11 – Vasily Avseenko, journalist and writer (b. 1842)
 August 28 – Fyodor Kamensky, sculptor (b. 1836)
 October 20 – Viktor Kirpichov, engineer and physicist (b. 1845)
 November 30 – Alexandra Albedinskaya, courtier  (b. 1834)

References

1913 in Russia
Years of the 20th century in the Russian Empire